Arches is a commune in the Vosges department in Grand Est in northeastern France. Arches station has rail connections to Épinal, Strasbourg and Nancy.

See also 
 Arches paper
 Communes of the Vosges department

References

External links 

 Municipal site
 Parish site

Communes of Vosges (department)